Yes Sir is a 2019 Maldivian comedy web series directed by Ali Seezan. The series stars Mohamed Manik, Aminath Nishfa, Irufana Ibrahim, Ismail Jumaih and Mohamed Nawaal as police officers, and Nuzuhath Shuaib, Ali Azim, Zeenath Abbas and Mohamed Faisal as various characters.

Cast 
 Mohamed Manik as Qadhir
 Aminath Nishfa as Haneefa Ibrahim
 Nuzuhath Shuaib as Ribena Mohamed/Lailaa/Sheereen/Kaiydha
 Ali Azim as Farooq/Moosa/Naseer/Hassan
 Irufana Ibrahim as Aishath Athoofa Musthafa
 Ismail Jumaih as Abdulla Muaz
 Mohamed Nawaal as Sunil Petty
 Zeenath Abbas as Lailaa/Zahira
 Fahudh as Basheer "Barbie" Adnan
 Mohamed Faisal as Abdul Satthar/Karan Bohar/Ranveer

Episodes

Release
The first episode of the series was streamed on 11 August 2019. Rest of the nine episodes from the season were streamed on every Wednesday of the week. Upon release, the series received mixed reviews from critics.

References

Serial drama television series
Maldivian television shows
Maldivian web series